Emanoil Bacaloglu (– 30 August 1891) was a Wallachian and Romanian mathematician, physicist and chemist.

Born in Bucharest and of Greek origin, he studied physics and mathematics in Paris and Leipzig, later becoming a professor at the University of Bucharest and, in 1879, a member of the Romanian Academy. Considered to be the founder of many scientific and technological fields in Romania (and aiding in the creation of the Romanian Athenaeum), Bacaloglu was also an accomplished scientist. He helped create Romanian-language terminology in his fields and was one of the principal founders of the Society of Physical Sciences in 1890.

He was also a participant in the 1848 Wallachian revolution.

He is known for the "Bacaloglu pseudosphere".  This is a surface of revolution for which the "Bacaloglu curvature" is constant.

Main works
 Elemente de fizică, 2nd ed.,  București, (1888).
 Elemente de algebră, 2nd ed., București, (1870).

References
 Florica Câmpan, "La pseudosphère de Bacaloglu", Acad. Roum. Bull. Sect. Sci. 24 (1943), 96–105.

External links
  Emanoil Bacaloglu în Galeria personalităților – Muzeul Virtual al Științei și Tehnicii Românești
 
  Emanoil Bacaloglu - Biography.name
 Short bio
 Short history, at the Polytechnic University of Bucharest

19th-century Romanian mathematicians
Romanian physicists
Romanian chemists
Titular members of the Romanian Academy
People of the Revolutions of 1848
Academic staff of the University of Bucharest
Scientists from Bucharest
1830 births
1891 deaths
Romanian expatriates in France